Luis Suárez (Luis Alberto Suárez Díaz, born 1987) is a Uruguayan professional footballer.

Luis Suárez may also refer to:

 Luis Suárez (bishop), Italian Roman Catholic bishop, Bishop of Dragonara, 1554–c. 1580
 Luis Suárez (baseball) (1916–1991), Cuban baseball player
 Luis Suárez Fernández (born 1924), Spanish historian
 Luis Suárez (footballer, born 1935) (Luis Suárez Miramontes, born 1935), Spanish footballer and manager, 1960 Ballon D'Or winner
 Luis Suárez (footballer, born 1938) (Luis Eduardo Suárez, 1938–2005), Argentine international footballer
 Luis Fernando Suárez (born 1959), Colombian footballer and manager
 Luis Suárez (footballer, born 1997) (Luis Javier Suárez Charris, born 1997), Colombian international footballer

See also 
 Luis Ruiz Suárez (1913–2011), Spanish-born Macanese Jesuit priest and missionary